Sivec is the trademark of the dolomitic marble extracted from the quarries of Mermeren Kombinat A.D., near the town of Prilep in North Macedonia. The fine grain makes it ideal for sculpture and architectural applications.

History

The extraction of Sivec marble can be dated back 500 BCE and earlier. Extraction flourished under the Roman period when the quarries near the ancient city of Stibera (today Prilep) produced stone for the production of Roman sculptures, as well as replicas of Greek original bronzes. These replicas went to Rome or to other parts of the empire.

Sivec is a famous material that was used in south-east Europe from the 3rd century BCE until the 5th century CE, producing some of the most visually stunning creations of the ancient world. It is estimated that during these centuries, 1.2 million cubic meters of Sivec White Marble were mined from the Prilep area.

Through the centuries, Sivec was used for many building and reconstruction sites throughout the world. It was used for the reconstruction of Roman emperor Diocletian's Palace in Split, Croatia. It has been also used by Edvard Ravnikar for lines at Prešeren Square in Ljubljana, Slovenia.

Today

The marble-bearing deposits in the area are widely known and are among the largest in the world.   The whiteness of the marble, its homogeneous form, and the micro-granular structure generate a high demand for Sivec marble on the international market.

Sivec®, or Bianco Sivec, is the registered name for this fine-grained white dolomitic marble.

Nowadays, Sivec has been selected to give the characteristic, exclusive white appearance in many large well-known projects including hotels, palaces, commercial buildings, etc.

Company

A quarry was established in 1946.  In 2009, NBGI Private Equity and Ethemba Capital acquired 88.4% of the shares of the company through Stone Works Holdings, a Dutch company co-owned by private equity funds managed by NBGI Private Equity and Ethemba Capital. On 2017 Pavlidis Marble Granite, one of the greatest companies for white marble, purchased the Stone Works Holdings, which owns 89,25% of Mermeren Kombinat A.D.

See also
List of types of marble

References 

Marble
Economy of North Macedonia
Prilep Municipality